City Twins Association is an association that develops cooperation between its members. The association represents the interests of twin cities that are divided into two and between two different countries, but form a one entity in terms of population, economy and society (such as Valga in Estonia and Valka in Latvia on the Estonian-Latvian border).

City Twins Association was founded on 13.12.2006 in Imatra, Finland.

Aims

The association aims to 
 boost and develop cross-border cooperation among its members 
 help its member's governing bodies and administrations to share experiences with each other and with other members 
 find and develop better solutions for local governments that can help to develop twin towns 
 create and execute cooperation projects

Members

 Imatra, Finland
 Svetogorsk, Russia
 Valga, Estonia
 Valka, Latvia
 Haparanda, Sweden
 Tornio, Finland
 Narva, Estonia
 Ivangorod, Russia
 Görlitz, Germany
 Frankfurt (Oder), Germany
 Słubice, Poland
 Cieszyn, Poland

References
Notes

2006 establishments in Finland